Fred Goudon is a French professional photographer. Originally from Cannes (south of France), he is now based in Paris.

He started shooting when his father gave him a camera as a gift on his 16th birthday. His work includes shooting of the 2006 issue of Dieux du Stade, calendar and DVD, featuring nude and semi-nude photographs of members of Stade Français, a Paris-based domestic French rugby team as well as at times players from other rugby union clubs and athletes from other sports. He was invited again to shoot both the 2014 calendar issue and the 2015 issue of the series. He publishes some of his work in books through Bruno Gmunder publishers.

Works
(Selective)
Calendars
2006: DIEVX DV STADE 2006 
2009: Provocateur and Magnifique
2010: Gilles Marini
2010: Masculinity
2011: Cinq 
2014: DIEVX DV STADE 2014
2015: DIEVX DV STADE 2015

Books 
2000: Bed Time Stories by Bruno Gmunder 
2005: Aqua 
2007: Sunday Morning 
2008: Virility 
2010: Cing
2013: ''Summer Souvenirs

References

External links
Official website
Fred Goudon blog

French photographers
Living people
Year of birth missing (living people)
People from Cannes